The following articles contain lists of resignations:
 List of resignations from government
 List of papal renunciations
 List of on-air resignations
 List of resignations from the Guantanamo military commission
 List of resignations in Iceland
 List of investigations, resignations, suspensions, and dismissals in conjunction with the news media phone hacking scandal

Specific resignations:
 Resignation of Pope Benedict XVI
 Resignation of Jehangir Karamat
 Resignation of Sarah Palin
 Resignation of Richard Nixon
 Resignation of Hosni Mubarak
 Resignation of Michael T. Flynn
 Resignation of Robert Mugabe
 Resignation of David Cameron
 Resignation of Pedro Pablo Kuczynski
 Resignation of Robert Fico
 Resignation of Silvio Berlusconi
Resignation of Tony Blair
Resignation of Theresa May
Resignation of Manuel Merino
Resignation of Margaret Thatcher
2020 Resignation of Sajid Javid

See also
 Resignation